Samoa has competed in twelve of the twenty-one previous Commonwealth Games, from 1974 as Western Samoa, and from 1997 as Samoa.

Overall Medal Tally
With sixteen medals, Samoa were thirtieth in the All-time tally of medals after the 2010 Games.

{{Medalists

Medals by sport

See also
All-time medal tally of Commonwealth Games

References

External links
Samoa Association of Sport and National Olympic Committee
Commonwealth Games Federation
Samoa

 
Nations at the Commonwealth Games